American rock band Linkin Park have released seven studio albums, three live albums, two compilation albums, two remix albums, three soundtrack albums, 12 video albums, 10 extended plays, 35 singles, 20 promotional singles, and 68 music videos. Linkin Park was formed in Agoura Hills, California, in 1996 by Mike Shinoda (vocals, keyboards, samplers and guitars), Brad Delson (guitar), and Rob Bourdon (drums). Joe Hahn (turntables) and Dave Farrell (bass) were later recruited, and in 1999, Chester Bennington (lead vocals) became a member, staying with the band until his death in 2017.

Linkin Park rose to international fame in 2000 with their debut album Hybrid Theory, which peaked at number two on the US Billboard 200. It was the seventh best-selling album of the 2000s, and certified Diamond in US and quadruple platinum in Europe. The fourth single from the album, "In the End", peaked at the second spot on the Billboard Hot 100 (the highest of Linkin Park's career), and stayed on the chart for 38 weeks. With first-week sales of 810,000, Linkin Park's second album Meteora (2003) entered the Billboard 200 at number one, becoming the third-best-selling album of the year.

In 2007, their third studio album, Minutes to Midnight, also debuted at number-one on the Billboard 200, selling 623,000 copies in its first week. A Thousand Suns (2010) became Linkin Park's third studio album to debut at the top of the Billboard 200, but its first-week sales were less than half of its predecessor—240,000 copies. Living Things followed in 2012, selling 223,000 copies in its first week and becoming the band's fourth studio album to debut at number-one.

Linkin Park has sold 70 million albums and 30 million singles worldwide. The band has produced eleven number-one singles on the Billboard Alternative Songs chart, and is the second-ever act to have at least ten weeks with three or more tracks on that chart. Two of these singles, "Crawling" and "Numb/Encore", earned the band two Grammy Awards. Linkin Park Underground, the band's official fan club, annually released EPs with rare tracks, demos, live recordings and remixes until 2017. Since Chester Bennington's death in July 2017, the band had not put together an LPU release.

Albums

Studio albums

Live albums

Compilation albums

Remix albums

Demo albums

Soundtrack albums

Extended plays

LP Underground extended plays

Singles

As lead artist

As featured artist

Promotional singles

Other charted and/or certified songs

Other appearances

Video albums

Music videos

Traditional videos

Lyric videos

Notes

References

External links

 
 Linkin Park Underground
 Linkin Park at AllMusic
 
 

Discography
Alternative rock discographies
Rap rock discographies
Discographies of American artists
Heavy metal group discographies